The Bavaria was an express train that linked München Hbf in Munich, Germany, with Zürich HB in Zurich, Switzerland.  Introduced in the 1950s, it ran through to Geneva (Cornavin station) until 1969, when it was cut back to Zurich.  The train was named on the basis that Bavaria is the Latin equivalent to the German word Bayern, the official name of the federal state of Bavaria, of which Munich is the capital.  It was operated by the Deutsche Bundesbahn / Deutsche Bahn (DB) and the Swiss Federal Railways (SBB-CFF-FFS).  The route also included a single stop in Austria, at Bregenz.  The  section between Lindau, Germany, and St. Margrethen, Switzerland, is located mostly in Austria, but Swiss locomotives hauled the train over this section, most of which is part of the Vorarlberg line of Austrian Federal Railways.

Originally and for several years, the Bavaria was a two-class Schnellzug (D), running Munich – Zurich – Bern – Geneva. As of 1963, the train was carrying a full restaurant car on the Munich – Lindau and St. Margrethen – Geneva portions, but by 1968 the dining car on the German portion had been replaced by a buffet car.

In 1969, the Bavaria was upgraded to a first-class-only Trans Europ Express (TEE), but the route was shortened in Switzerland, with the western terminus moved to Zurich.  The TEE carried a restaurant car over the full route, Munich – Zurich, with service being provided by the Swiss Restaurant Car Company.

On 22 May 1977, the  Bavaria reverted to being a two-class Schnellzug.  Seven years later, effective 3 June 1984, it was reclassified as an InterCity (IC) train, and on 31 May 1987, it was included in the then-new EuroCity (EC) network.  It ceased to be a named train at the end of 2002.

On 9 February 1971, the Bavaria was involved in a serious derailment and collision in Aitrang, Bavaria, in which the train formation (consist) was destroyed, and 28 people lost their lives.

See also

 History of rail transport in Germany
 History of rail transport in Switzerland
 List of named passenger trains of Europe

References

Further reading
 
 
 
 

EuroCity
International named passenger trains
Named passenger trains of Germany
Named passenger trains of Switzerland
Trans Europ Express
Railway services discontinued in 2002